In high energy physics, a pseudovector meson or axial vector meson is a meson with total spin 1 and even parity (+) (usually noted as 

Compare to a vector meson, which has a total spin 1 and odd parity

Charge parity (C) in addition to spatial parity (P)
The known pseudovector mesons fall into two different classes, all have even spatial parity ( P = "+" ), but they differ in another kind of parity called charge parity (C) which can be either even (+) or odd (−). The two types of pseudovector meson are:
 those with odd   charge parity 
 those with even charge parity 

The  1  group has no intrinsic spin excitation  , but do gain spin from angular momentum  of the orbits of the two constituent quarks around their mutual center.

Pseudovector, or axial vector, mesons in the  1  category are most readily be seen in proton‑antiproton annihilation and pion‑nucleon scattering. The mesons in the  1  category are normally seen in proton-proton and pion-nucleon scattering.

Discrepant mass estimates
The difference between the two groups gives them slightly different masses, from the spin‑orbit coupling rule. There are considerable uncertainties in experimental measurement of pseudovector mesons; more experimental data will be needed to confirm and accurately determine the discrepancy between theory and measurement.

The  1  multiplet of light mesons may show similar behavior to that of other vector mesons, in that the mixing of light quarks with strange quarks appears to be small for this quantum number. The  1  multiplet, on the other hand, may be affected by other factors that generally reduce meson masses. Again, further experimentation is required in order to solidify the observations.

Examples
 1 candidates:  (1170),  (1235),  (1380)
 1 candidates:  (1285),  (1260),  (1420)
 strange candidates:  (1270),  (1400)
 heavy candidates:  ,

See also
List of mesons
Pseudoscalar meson
Scalar meson
Pseudovector boson

Mesons
Subatomic particles with spin 1
Bosons